Banksiops is an extinct genus of temnospondyl amphibian in the family Brachyopidae, recovered from Tasmania.

The type species, Blinasaurus townrowi, Cosgriff, 1974, was published as Banksia townrowi Warren & Marsicano, 1998 in a revision that erected this genus, a name emended to Banksiops townrowi Warren & Marsicano, 2000 in a subsequent note. The authors Anne Warren and Claudia Marscicano were alerted to another animal, a species of mite, that had used the name to commemorate the acarologist Nathan Banks.  The genus name Banksia, still current for the flowering plants Banksia (named for Joseph Banks), was proposed by the palaeontologists Warren and Marsicano for the geologist Max Banks.

See also

 Prehistoric amphibian
 List of prehistoric amphibians

References

Brachyopids
Triassic temnospondyls of Australia

Paleontology in Tasmania